Todd Ridge is a narrow, flat-topped rock ridge at the northwest end of Long Hills, Horlick Mountains. Mapped by United States Geological Survey (USGS) from surveys and U.S. Navy aerial photography, 1958–60. Named by Advisory Committee on Antarctic Names (US-ACAN) for Marion N. Todd, aurora scientist at Byrd Station in 1958.

Ridges of Marie Byrd Land